Donald Lee Haskins (March 14, 1930 – September 7, 2008), nicknamed "The Bear", was an American basketball player and coach. He played college basketball for three years under coach Henry Iba at Oklahoma A&M (now Oklahoma State University). He was the head coach at the University of Texas at El Paso from 1961 to 1999 (the school was known as Texas Western College until 1967). In 1966 his team won the NCAA tournament over the Wildcats of the University of Kentucky, coached by Adolph Rupp. The watershed game highlighted the end of racial segregation in college basketball.

In his time at Texas Western/UTEP, he compiled a 719–353 record, suffering only five losing seasons. His Miners won 14 Western Athletic Conference championships and four WAC tournament titles, had fourteen NCAA tournament berths and made seven trips to the NIT. Haskins led UTEP to 17 20-plus-win seasons and served as an assistant Olympic team coach in 1972. He was admitted to the Naismith Memorial Basketball Hall of Fame in 1997 as a basketball coach. His 1966 team was inducted in its entirety by the same Hall of Fame on September 7, 2007.

Early coaching career
After college and a stint with the Amateur Athletic Union's Artesia Travelers, Haskins began coaching small-town Texas high schools (Benjamin, Hedley and Dumas) from 1955 to 1961. He took a pay cut for a chance to be a college coach, accepting a job offer at Texas Western College—now known as the University of Texas at El Paso (UTEP) in 1961.

In the 1950s, prior to Haskins' arrival, Texas Western recruited and played African American players, in a time when it was still common to find all-white college sports teams, particularly in the South.  When Haskins arrived in El Paso, he inherited three black players from his coaching predecessor.  One of those players, El Paso native Nolan Richardson, later won the 1994 NCAA Division I men's basketball tournament national championship as the head coach at Arkansas. 

In 1961–62, Haskins' first season as head coach, the Miners had an 18–6 record.  the next year they posted a 19–7 mark and made the first of 14 NCAA tournament appearances under Haskins. They again reached the NCAA Tournament in 1964 and played in the NIT in 1965. On numerous occasions, Haskins stated that he believed his 1964 team could have won the NCAA Tournament had All-American Jim Barnes not fouled out after playing only eight minutes in a 64–60 loss to Kansas State in the tournament.

1966 NCAA Championship team

The Texas Western Miners finished the 1965–66 regular season with a 23–1 record, entering the NCAA Tournament ranked third in the nation in the final regular season AP college basketball poll.

In the first round of the tournament, the Miners defeated Oklahoma City 89–74. In the next round, they defeated Cincinnati 78–76 in overtime. They went on to defeat Kansas in double overtime in the Midwest Regional Finals, 81–80, and to defeat Utah in the national semifinals, 85–78.

Facing the top-ranked University of Kentucky in the championship game, Haskins made history by starting five African American players for the first time in a championship game against Kentucky's all-white squad, coached by Adolph Rupp. The Miners took the lead midway in the first half and never relinquished it — though Kentucky closed to within a point early in the second half. The Miners finished with 72 points to Kentucky's 65, winning the tournament and finishing the year with a 28–1 record.

Later asked about his decision to start five African American players, Haskins downplayed the significance of his decision. "I really didn't think about starting five black guys. I just wanted to put my five best guys on the court," Haskins was later quoted as saying. "I just wanted to win that game."

Though credited with advancing the desegregation of college basketball teams in the South, he wrote in his book, Glory Road, "I certainly did not expect to be some racial pioneer or to change the world."

Post-championship career
Haskins was never able to duplicate his 1966 success. After winning the 1966 title, his Miners would only win seven more NCAA Tournament games and only survived the tournament's first weekend twice, in 1967 and 1992.

Nonetheless, he is regarded as an important figure in basketball history. Among the players he coached at UTEP over the years were future NBA all-stars Nate Archibald, Tim Hardaway, and Antonio Davis. Other UTEP alums moving to the NBA included Marlon Maxey and Greg Foster. He was also a mentor for several future coaches, including Nolan Richardson and Tim Floyd. He served as an assistant coach under Hank Iba in the 1972 Summer Olympics in Munich.

A street is named after him in El Paso's East side. In 1977, UTEP moved from Memorial Gym, home of the 1966 champions, to the larger Special Events Center. In 1998, before what would be Haskins' last season, it was renamed the Don Haskins Center in his honor.

Bob Knight was Haskins' fishing partner and one of his best friends. Another good friend, Norm Ellenberger, was former coach of the New Mexico Lobos.

In 1997, he was inducted into the Oklahoma Sports hall of Fame.

Glory Road

Glory Road, a Disney film about the then-Texas Western 1966 championship season, was released on January 13, 2006. Haskins is portrayed in the film by actor Josh Lucas. On November 29, 2005, the City of El Paso renamed the street between its two basketball arenas "Glory Road." Adolph Rupp, Jr., pointed out that his father had previously used the term "Glory Road" in his farewell speech to his fans and worried that his father would be villainized in the film. However, director Jim Gartner stated that Rupp Sr. would not be negatively portrayed in the film, claiming that Jon Voight, who played Rupp, was careful in his role, seeking not to mischaracterize Rupp as a racist.

Haskins stated his disappointment at the cutting of the movie scenes of his one-on-one games with his boyhood friend Herman Carr, who is African-American. Carr was present in El Paso as a guest for the premiere screening, November 28, 2005. These scenes would have depicted a formative influence on Haskins' game of basketball. Haskins appeared in the movie as an extra by playing a gas station attendant.

Glory Road was produced by Jerry Bruckheimer, and was based upon Haskins' official same-titled autobiography, written with Dan Wetzel and released by Hyperion Books in 2005. A national best seller, it was reprinted five times in its first four months of release and was selected as an "Editor's Choice" by the New York Times Book Review.

Death
Haskins died at his home on September 7, 2008. He was survived by his wife Mary, sons Brent, Steve, and David, and grandsons John Paul, Cameron, and Dominick. A fourth son, Mark, died in 1994. His son Steve is a professional golfer who began play on the Champions Tour after reaching the age of 50 and won two events on the Nationwide Tour during his regular career years. Haskins is buried at the Memory Gardens of the Valley in Santa Teresa, New Mexico.

Head coaching record

See also
 List of college men's basketball coaches with 600 wins
 List of NCAA Division I Men's Final Four appearances by coach
 List of teachers portrayed in films

Bibliography
 Fitzpatrick, Frank. And the Walls Came Tumbling Down: The Basketball Game That Changed American Sports (2000)
Haskins, Don with Dan Wetzel. Glory Road: My Story of the 1966 NCAA Basketball Championship and How One Team Triumphed Against the Odds and Changed America Forever. New York:Hyperion, 2006. 254 pp. No index. . 
 Sanchez,  Ramon. Basketball's Biggest Upset: Texas Western Changed The Sport With A Win Over Kentucky In 1966 (1991) excerpt

References

External links
 UTEP profile
 Encyclopedia of Oklahoma History and Culture profile

1930 births
2008 deaths
American men's basketball coaches
Basketball coaches from Oklahoma
Basketball players from Oklahoma
College basketball announcers in the United States
College men's basketball head coaches in the United States
High school basketball coaches in the United States
Naismith Memorial Basketball Hall of Fame inductees
Oklahoma State Cowboys basketball players
People from El Paso, Texas
Sportspeople from Enid, Oklahoma
UTEP Miners men's basketball coaches
American men's basketball players
Enid High School alumni